The Fred R. Hayward House is a historic house at 1547 Centre Street in Newton, Massachusetts.  This large -story stucco-clad house was designed by Winchester architect Robert Coit, and built in 1912.  Mostly rectangular in its massing with a hip roof, there are two forward-facing gables framing the main entry, the right one projecting slightly.  The roof of the left side gable sweeps down to shelter a sunroom.  Fred R. Hayward was later the president of the New England Confectionery Company, which had been created by his father in a sequence of mergers.

The house was listed on the National Register of Historic Places in 1990.

See also
 National Register of Historic Places listings in Newton, Massachusetts

References

Houses on the National Register of Historic Places in Newton, Massachusetts
Houses completed in 1912
1912 establishments in Massachusetts